The Ontario Scotties Tournament of Hearts is the Ontario provincial curling championship for women's curling. The tournament is run by CurlON, the curling association for Southern Ontario. The winning team represents Team Ontario at the national Scotties Tournament of Hearts.

History
The first women's provincial championship occurred in 1956 in North Bay, and was known as the "all-Ontario ladies' curling championship". It pitted the winners of three regional women's curling associations (the Ontario Ladies' Curling Association, covering Southern Ontario, the Northern Ontario Curling Association, covering Northeastern Ontario and the Western Ontario Ladies' Curling Association, covering Northwestern Ontario) against each other in a two-day, double round-robin series.

In 1960, the tournament expanded to four teams, with the winner from Eastern Ontario added to the event, and was reduced to a single round robin. The winner represented Ontario at the Eastern Canadian Championship that year. Each provincial tournament in Eastern Canada would be referred to as "Dominion Silver 'D' competitions, after the Dominion supermarket chain became a sponsor. The tournament went back to a double round robin the following year (with four teams), with the winner going on to represent Ontario at the first official national championships, the 1961 Diamond D Championship. After a Quebec team from Noranda qualified as the Northern Ontario representative in the 1963 championship, the Ontario Ladies Curling Association voted to limit the event to just Ontario teams going forward. In 1964, the field was expanded to six teams, with the addition of two more Southern Ontario qualifiers. Due to a governing body dispute, Southern Ontario teams were barred from the 1968 tournament, leaving just three entries (Eastern Ontario, Northern Ontario and North-Western Ontario) to play a double round robin. The event remained a three-team event until 1972 after the dispute with the Southern Ontario Ladies Curling Association was resolved in 1971. The three Southern Ontario teams were added back, making the event a six team, single round robin event once again. This six team round robin format lasted until 1987, when the field was expanded to a ten team round robin. During this time, the event was known as the Ontario Lassies from c. 1975 to 1982 following the sponsorship of Macdonald Tobacco, and then as the Ontario Scott Tournament of Hearts in 1982, following the sponsorship of Scott Paper.

Until 1991, the team with the best round robin record won the provincial championship. In 1991, a three-team playoff was introduced, with the top team earning a bye to the final. A page playoff was added in 2003, which involved adding a fourth playoff team. The event was re-named the Ontario Scotties Tournament of Hearts in 2007 when Scott Paper was sold to Kruger Inc.

In 2015, Northern Ontario earned its own direct entry to the national Scotties Tournament of Hearts, and so the Ontario Hearts would thus be a championship for teams from Southern Ontario only. The event remained a ten team event with a four team page playoff until 2017, when it was reduced to eight teams with a three team playoff. In 2018, the event adopted a 12 team triple knockout format for the first time, followed by a page playoff. In 2019, it returned to eight teams with a three team playoff. A last minute decision by CurlON added a ninth team for the 2020 event. The 2021 event was cancelled for the first time, due to the COVID-19 pandemic in Ontario. CurlON appointed a team to represent the province at that year's Hearts. The 2022 event was suspended due to the new provincial regulations caused by the Omicron variant of COVID-19, and CurlON appointed a team again for the second straight year. An eight-team provincial championship was still held in 2022, but in April that year, well after the national championship, with the winner earning a bye to the 2023 provincial championship. In 2023, the event was expanded to twelve teams.

Champions
National champions are indicated in bold. Teams from Northern Ontario are indicated in italics, as prior to 2015, Northern Ontario did not have their own provincial championship. National champions get an automatic bye into the following years' national championships, so they cannot defend their provincial championship. A national championship has been held since 1961, although the provincial women's championship has been held since 1956.

1956–1990

1991–present
A playoff was added in 1991. Runners up from Northern Ontario in italics.

References

See also

 
Scotties Tournament of Hearts provincial tournaments
Scot